Buenos Aires, also known as Buena Ayres or Buenos Ayres, is a populated place situated in Pima County, Arizona. Buenos Aires is located on the Tohono Oʼodham Indian Reservation. The settlement once had its own school district (School District No. 11, Pima County), which has since become part of the Baboquivari Unified School District.

References

Populated places in Pima County, Arizona